The R881 or Amtali-Khepupara-Kuakata Highway is a transportation artery in Bangladesh, which connects Kuakata Sea beach with Regional Highway R880 (at Amtali).

See also 
 N8 (Bangladesh)
 List of roads in Bangladesh

References 

Regional Highways in Bangladesh